A with tilde (А̃ а̃; italics: А̃ а̃) is a letter of the Cyrillic script. In all its forms it looks exactly like the Latin letter A with tilde (Ã ã Ã ã).

A with tilde is used only in the alphabet of the Khinalug language where it represents a nasalized open back unrounded vowel /ɑ̃/.

See also
Ã ã : Latin letter Ã - a Portuguese and Silesian letter
Cyrillic characters in Unicode

References

Cyrillic letters with diacritics
Letters with tilde